Boris Pavlovich Konstantinov (July 6, 1910 – July 9, 1969) was a Soviet physicist who specialized in thermonuclear fuel processing and have written numerous works on acoustics and on both corpuscular and optical plasma diagnostics. He was a graduate of Ioffe Institute. In 1953 he became corresponding member of the Academy of Sciences of the Soviet Union and by 1960 became its full member. In 1967 he became its Vice-President of the Academy at which position he served till his death in 1969.

References

1910 births
1969 deaths
20th-century Russian physicists
Scientists from Saint Petersburg
Communist Party of the Soviet Union members
Full Members of the USSR Academy of Sciences
Peter the Great St. Petersburg Polytechnic University alumni
Academic staff of Peter the Great St. Petersburg Polytechnic University
Members of the Supreme Soviet of the Russian Soviet Federative Socialist Republic, 1963–1967
Members of the Supreme Soviet of the Russian Soviet Federative Socialist Republic, 1967–1971
Heroes of Socialist Labour
Stalin Prize winners
Lenin Prize winners
Recipients of the Order of Lenin
Recipients of the Order of the Red Banner of Labour
Russian physicists
Soviet physicists
Burials at Bogoslovskoe Cemetery